Diplomatic relations between the Czech Republic and Uruguay were established in times of the Czechoslovakia. There are also some Czech immigrants in Uruguay. 

The Czech Republic is accredited to Uruguay from its embassy in Buenos Aires, Argentina. Uruguay is accredited to the Czech Republic from its embassy in Vienna, Austria.

Agreements
There are a number of agreements between both countries:
Investment promotion and protection agreement (1996)
Trade agreement (1996)

See also 
Foreign relations of the Czech Republic
Foreign relations of Uruguay

References

External links 

 
Uruguay
Czech